Vincent Limare (born 26 September 1992) is a French judoka. He is the gold medallist in the -60 kg at the 2014 Judo Grand Prix Qingdao

References

External links
 

1992 births
Living people
French male judoka
Sportspeople from Rouen
Judoka at the 2015 European Games
European Games competitors for France
21st-century French people